My Way or the Highway may refer to:
 My Way or the Highway (album), a 1991 album by blues guitarist Guitar Shorty
 "My Way or the Highway" (Scrubs), an episode of the television sitcom Scrubs
 "My Way or the Highway...", a song by Relient K from the album The Anatomy of the Tongue in Cheek

See also
 "My Way or the Highway to Heaven", a 2018 episode of The Simpsons
 My Way (disambiguation)